Pingxiang County is a county under the administration of the prefecture-level city of Xingtai, in the south of Hebei province, China, located about  from downtown Xingtai. In the Han dynasty, Pingxiang County was known as Julu County and was the site of the Battle of Julu in 207 BC, as well as being the birthplace of Zhang Jue and his brothers Zhang Bao and Zhang Liang, who started the Yellow Turban Rebellion in the 180s.

Administrative divisions
Pingxiang consists of 3 towns and 4 townships.

Towns:
Fengzhou, Hegumiao, Pingxiang

Townships:
Youzhao Township, Jiegu Township, Tianfucun Township, Xunzhao Township

Climate

References

External links
https://web.archive.org/web/20070929160030/http://www.0319xt.cn/renwen/xiangxi.asp?id=272

County-level divisions of Hebei
Xingtai